Cirrochroa satellita is an Indomalayan species of heliconiine butterfly.

Subspecies
C. s. satellita (Peninsular Malaya, Sumatra, Philippines)
C. s. illergata Fruhstorfer, 1912 (Borneo, Palawan)

References

Vagrantini
Butterflies described in 1869
Butterflies of Asia
Taxa named by Arthur Gardiner Butler